20th Century Masters: The Christmas Collection may refer to:

 20th Century Masters – The Christmas Collection: The Best of George Strait
 20th Century Masters – The Christmas Collection: The Best of Reba